Star Dust is a 1940 American comedy drama film directed by Walter Lang and starring Linda Darnell and John Payne, Roland Young and Charlotte Greenwood.

Plot
Amalgamated Pictures is seeking new stars for its motion pictures. Talent scout Thomas Brooke hits the road, looking for newcomers to bring back for screen tests, hopefully to impress the studio's boss, Dane Wharton.

Brooke discovers a football player in Arizona who can sing, Bud Borden, and a talented Texas singer, Mary Andrews. On a visit to Arkansas, his presence is discovered by aspiring actress Carolyn Sayres, who schemes to get Brooke to take an interest in her. He does, at least until he finds out she's still a bit too young.

Everyone travels to Hollywood for screen tests and a visit to Grauman's Chinese Theater, where they get a kick out of the footprints of movie stars embedded in the cement. Brooke encounters the casting director's own new find, June Lawrence, a singer. He clashes with the studio, which offers a contract only to Mary and sends his other discoveries home.

Carolyn doesn't take no for an answer and comes back. Brooke now gets in her corner and schemes to insert footage from her screen test into a theater's newsreel. The next thing they all know, Carolyn is not only a star, Grauman's is inviting her to be immortalized in cement.

Cast
 Linda Darnell as Carolyn Sayres
 John Payne as Ambrose Fillmore / Bud Borden
 Roland Young as Thomas Brooke
 Charlotte Greenwood as Lola Langdon
 William Gargan as Dane Wharton
 Mary Beth Hughes as June Lawrence
 Mary Healy as Mary Andrews
 Donald Meek as Sam Wellman
 Jessie Ralph as Aunt Martha Parker
 Walter Kingsford as Napoleon in Screen Test
 George Montgomery as Ronnie
 Robert Lowery as Bellboy
 Hal K. Dawson as Cargo
 Jody Gilbert as Swedish Maid
 Gary Breckner as Announcer
 Paul Hurst as Mac, Amalgamated Lab Tech
 Irving Bacon as Jefferson Hotel Desk Clerk
 Billy Wayne as Amalgamated Cameraman
 Fern Emmett as Hotel Stenographer
 Lynne Roberts as College Girl

References

External links

1940 films
1940 comedy-drama films
20th Century Fox films
American black-and-white films
American comedy-drama films
Films about Hollywood, Los Angeles
Films directed by Walter Lang
Films produced by Darryl F. Zanuck
Films scored by David Buttolph
1940s English-language films
1940s American films